Franz Wendelin "Hanns" Seidel (12 October 1901 – 5 August 1961) was a German politician who served as Prime Minister of Bavaria from 1957 to 1960. He was a member, and from 1955 to 1961 chairman, of the Christian Social Union of Bavaria.

Biography
Seidel was born in Schweinheim, now part of Aschaffenburg, one of seven children; his parents were Johann and Christine Seidel. He was originally baptized under the name Franz Wendelin but was soon called simply Hanns. His father died when he was seven and the family had to live in relative poverty from then on. Despite those circumstances, he managed to obtain a good education.

Hanns Seidel studied law in Jena, Freiburg and Würzburg, where he graduated in 1929. He worked as a lawyer in Aschaffenburg after this and married Ilse Tenter, who he had two sons with. As a strict Catholic, he joined the Bavarian People's Party in 1932. His outspokenness about the Nazis soon got him into trouble and he had to withdraw his candidacy for the Aschaffenburg town council. He briefly had to escape to Memel (now Klaipėda) in Eastern Prussia to avoid arrest but returned home soon after.

He was elected to the Bavarian Landtag in 1946. Previous to this, the US occupation authorities had already made him Landrat for Aschaffenburg due to the fact that he had no previous political history in the Nazi regime. As a liberal-conservative he supported the multi-confessional fraction in his party. He became Minister for Economy in 1947 and held this post until his party's election defeat in 1954. He was an important force in the reconstruction efforts in post-war Bavaria. He was also highly regarded by the German chancellor Konrad Adenauer who unsuccessfully tried to convince him to take up a post in the federal government. In 1954, he was made speaker for the opposition, the year after, he became party chairman of the CSU, defeating Franz Josef Strauß in a highly contested party vote. He immediately went to modernize the party and its politics.

After Wilhelm Hoegner resigned as Minister-President of Bavaria, Hanns Seidel was elected by the Landtag as Minister-President on 16 October 1957. He had to resign from this post on 21 January 1960 due to health reasons and died the year after, at the age of 59, in Munich.

The Hanns-Seidel-Stiftung (Hanns Seidel Foundation), formed in 1967, a taxpayer-money founded political research foundation closely associated with the CSU, is named after him.

References

External links
 Official website of the Hanns Seidel Foundation (in English)
 Official Bavarian government website -  Hanns Seidel biography (in German)
 Universitätsbibliothek Regensburg - Boisls bayrische Biography - Hans Seidel (in German), page 717
 
 Hanns Seidel Foundation website - Biography of Hanns Seidel

1901 births
1961 deaths
People from Aschaffenburg
Ministers-President of Bavaria
Ministers of the Bavaria State Government
Bavarian People's Party politicians
People from the Kingdom of Bavaria
German military personnel of World War II
German Roman Catholics
Grand Crosses 1st class of the Order of Merit of the Federal Republic of Germany
Burials at the Westfriedhof (Munich)